Norrtåg (English: Northern Trains) is a publicly owned company which is owned by Norrbotten County, Västerbotten County, Västernorrland County and Jämtland County in Sweden. The company owns passenger trains and organises passenger train operation. Norrtåg controls ticket sales and contracts an operator which handles actual train operation (staff and permits). The trains are operated under the brand name Norrtåg.

Norrtåg started operation in 2010 on the brand new railway Botniabanan, and in 2011 it took over the until then branded Mittnabotåget services. Trains were operated by Botniatåg (an SJ AB / DB Regio joint venture) until 20 August 2016, when Tågkompaniet (now Vy Tåg) took over the franchise.

The Norrtåg franchise currently serves 82 stations with a total of 41 daily return trains reaching a total distance of 1 781 km.

Services 
The following routes are currently operated by Norrtåg.
The route Sundsvall - Umeå - Kiruna/Luleå is also served by two daily sleeper services from Stockholm/Gothenburg. The Central line route carries High Speed and intercity services between Ånge and Östersund/Storlien.

Rolling Stock 
The Norrtåg franchise is operated with the following trains as of the 2018 timetable.

Norrtåg's trains are leased from transregional rolling stock operator Transitio and maintained at the purpose-built depot at Umeå freight yard. Two additional Regina sets were cascaded from Uppsala following the introduction of ER1 class Stadler Dosto units on their regional network, in preparation for services on the Haparanda line.

References

External links
 Norrtåg web site 

Rail transport brands
Regional rail in Sweden
Swedish companies established in 2010
Railway companies established in 2010